Bai Virbaijee Soparivala (BVS) Parsi High School is a private school in Karachi, Sindh, Pakistan. It opened in 1859 as Karachi Parsi Balak Shalla, by the Zoroastrian residents of Karachi.

History
 The Zoroastrian residents of Karachi, feeling the need for imparting religious education and knowledge of Gujarati, opened on 23 May 1859, “The Parsi Balakshala,” or children's school.
 In June 1862, Seth Shapurji Hormusji Soparivala was appointed the secretary of the school. In May 1870, Seth Shahpurji Hormusji Soparivala, in memory of his late wife, Bai Virbaiji Soparivala, donated his personal two-story house on Frere Street (valued Rs. 10,000/-), to be used as a coeducation vernacular school. Thereafter, the school was named the Parsi Virbaiji School. The opening ceremony was performed on 24 September 1870, by the Commissioner in Sindh, Sir William Merewether.
 On 1 April 1918, the girls' section of the school was separated and commenced to function on the first floor of the building. In June 1919, the girls’ school shifted to its present location of Mama School.
 Through the efforts of the managing committee and principal, technical classes were organized in the school, and in June 1946, a technical workshop building began.
 In 1947, after the partition of India, on the personal request to the elders of the Parsi community by the Quaid-I-Azam, Mr. Mohammad Ali Jinnah, the school opened its doors to all Muslim and other non Parsi children of the new nation.
 On 23 May 1958, the school began Centenary celebrations and the entire Parsi community participated in the functions that were organized.

Architect

In 1875, Parsi Virbaiji Soparivala School became Bai Virbaiji Soparivala Parsi High School and H. E. Sir Robert Temple, Governor of Bombay, visited the BVS. In 1877, Seth Shahpurji was awarded the "Certificate of Loyalty" by Queen Victoria for his services in the field of education and social sector. In 1904, the construction of the present building started, and, in 1906, BVS shifted to the new building at Victoria Road (now Abdullah Haroon Road). BVS was designed by Moses Somake, the Jewish architect who is perhaps the first known architect of many Karachi buildings.

Notable alumni

Ardeshir Cowasjee
 Irfan Essa
 Bilal Maqsood
 Farooq Sattar
 Waqar Zaka
 Murtaza Wahab

References

External links
 
 The Virbaijeeite Alumni Association

Schools in Karachi
Educational institutions established in 1859
Cricket grounds in Pakistan
Zoroastrianism in Pakistan
1859 establishments in British India